A Jecklin disk is a sound-absorbing disk placed between two microphones to create an acoustic "shadow" from one microphone to the other. The resulting two signals can possibly produce a pleasing stereo effect. A matching pair of small-diaphragm omnidirectional microphones is generally used for this technique.

The technique was invented by Jürg Jecklin, the former chief sound engineer of Swiss Radio now teaching at the University for Music and Performing Arts in Vienna.  He referred to the technique as an "Optimal Stereo Signal" (OSS).  In the beginning Jecklin used omnidirectional microphones on either side of a 30 cm (1 ft.) disk about 2 cm (3/4") thick, which had a muffling layer of soft plastic foam or wool fleece on each side. The capsules of the microphones were above the surface of the disc, just in the center, 16.5 centimeters (6½") apart from each other and each pointing 20 degrees outside. Jecklin found the 16.5 cm (6½") ear spacing between the microphones too narrow. In his own paper, he notes that the disk has to be 35 cm (13¾") in diameter and the distance between the microphones should be 36 cm (14 3/16"). The concept is to make use of the baffle to recreate some of the frequency-response, time and amplitude variations human listeners experience, but in such a way that the recording also produces a useful stereo image through loudspeakers. Conventional binaural or dummy head recordings are not as convincing when played back over speakers; headphone playback is needed.

The Jecklin disk is a refinement of the baffled microphone technique for stereo initially described by Alan Blumlein in his 1931 patent on binaural sound.

There is a noteworthy change from the original small version: Instead of 30 cm, the disk now has a slightly larger diameter of 35 cm. But what stands out to an even greater degree, is the greatly enlarged microphone spacing – rather than formerly 16.5 cm as a human "head diameter" (ear distance) there is now a distance of 36 cm (double-headed?). Jecklin's German from his script: "Zwei Kugelmikrofone sind mit einem gegenseitigen Abstand von 36 cm angeordnet und durch eine mit Schaumstoff belegte Scheibe von 35 cm Durchmesser akustisch getrennt." Translated: Two omnidirectional microphones are placed with a distance between them of 36 cm (14 3/16"), and acoustically separated by a foam-covered disk having a diameter of 35 cm (13¾"). That shows a great difference to the initial smaller Jecklin Disk of 30 centimeters diameter and the distance between the microphones of 16.5 centimeters.

References

External links 
Josephson Engineering – A picture of the old Jecklin Disk
Core Sound – A picture of the old Jecklin Disk and another variant, the Schneider Disk
The new larger Jecklin disk (OSS technology)
The Jecklin disk – a stereo microphone array with isolating baffle – new and old

Audio engineering
Microphones